What Women Want is a 2011 Chinese-Hong Kong romantic action comedy film remake of the 2000 American film of the same name. The film stars Andy Lau and Gong Li. What Women Want was released in China on 3 February 2011, the first day of Chinese New Year.

The plot is a very close remake of the American version with some minor changes. The plot takes place mostly in an advertising company in Beijing, in which Lau plays a slick ad agency creative director who gets acquainted with his new talented competition, played by Gong. He is helped when he gets the ability to hear women's thoughts due to a freak accident.

Cast
 Andy Lau as Sun Zigang
 Gong Li as Li Yilong
 Yuan Li as Yanni
 Banny Chen as Xiao Fei
 Hu Jing as Zhao Hung
 Zhu Zhu as Xiao Wu
 Li Chengru as CEO Dong
 Anya Wu as Dong's wife
 Osric Chau as Chen Erdong
 Wang Deshun as Sun Meisheng
 Chen Daming as Young Sun Meisheng
 Mavis Pan as Pan's secretary
 Russell Wong as Peter
 Kelly Hu as Girl in Lotto Commercial
 Ping Wong as Foo Ping Pong

See also
 Andy Lau filmography

References

External links
 
 What Women Want at Hong Kong Cinemagic
 
 
 Justified Remake? Liu Dehua and Gong Li meet at last in 'Wo Zhi Nuren Xin' - 'What Women Want'] at [http://thinkingchinese.com Thinking Chinese

2011 films
2010s Mandarin-language films
2010s Cantonese-language films
2011 romantic comedy films
Chinese romantic comedy films
Hong Kong romantic comedy films
Hong Kong fantasy films
Chinese remakes of foreign films
Hong Kong remakes of American films
Films set in Beijing
Films shot in Beijing
2010s Hong Kong films